Cheedella is a village in Penpahad mandal of Suryapet district in Telangana, India. It is located 33 km from district headquarters, Suryapet.

Geography

Demographics
Cheedella is the most populated village in Penpahad mandal . It has population of  5943 of which 2986 are males while 2957 are females as per Population Census 2011. The literacy rate of village was 59.34% where Male literacy stands at 69.72% while female literacy rate was 48.78%.

Politics
It falls under Suryapet Assembly constituency and the village is administrated by Sarpanch , who is elected representative of village.

References

Villages in Suryapet district